Thuine is a municipality in the Emsland district, in Lower Saxony, Germany.

People 
 Doris Achelwilm (born 1976), politician (The Linke)

References

Emsland